Damien James Egan is a British Labour Party politician, and the second directly elected Mayor of Lewisham in Greater London.

Early life
Egan was born in Cork, Ireland, and raised in Bristol. During his childhood, his family were homeless on two occasions. He later studied at St Mary's Twickenham, and moved to Lewisham after his graduation. He has described his family as "cultural Catholics"; as an adult, he converted to Judaism.

Political career
At the 2005 general election Egan came third as the Labour candidate in Weston-super-Mare. At the 2010 general election he was the party's candidate in Beckenham, where he again finished third behind the Conservative and Liberal Democrats candidates. Damien was elected as a councillor for Lewisham Central in 2010 and became the cabinet member for housing in 2014. In 2018 he won the May 2018 Mayoral election and was re-elected in 2022.

Mayor of Lewisham
As a mayor, Egan has committed to deliver 1000 new social homes and double the number of Living Wage employers in the borough. In January 2019, he launched London's first indoor sleeping pods for homeless people in the emergency night shelter.

2018 
He won the May 2018 mayoral election, having previously been a borough councillor for the Lewisham Central ward.

2022 
Damien was re-elected in the 2022 election. The Labour party held all 54 seats for local councillors in a majority win.

References

Mayors of places in Greater London
Living people
English LGBT politicians
Labour Party (UK) mayors
LGBT mayors of places in the United Kingdom
Year of birth missing (living people)
21st-century LGBT people